Basta't Kasama Kita is a 1995 Philippine romantic comedy-drama film directed by Rory B. Quintos on her feature film directorial debut. Starring Aga Muhlach and Puerto Rican actress and Miss Universe 1993, Dayanara Torres. The plot is similar to that of the 1953 film Roman Holiday, which starred Audrey Hepburn and Gregory Peck. In a 2017 retrospective by CNN Philippines, Basta't Kasama Kita was selected as one of the best romantic-comedy films in the last 25 years.

The film was digitally restored and remastered by the ABS-CBN Film Archives and Central Digital Lab.

Synopsis
The film follows Marinella (Torres), a European royalty who longs for an independent life by plotting a royal visit to the Philippines and then escape her security detail. In the Philippines she accidentally meets Alex (Muhlach), a jeepney driver who agrees to her plea to work as a housemaid in exchange for food and shelter; the two suddenly fall for each other.

Plot
The film begins with a banquet organized by the Department of Foreign Affairs for Princess Marinella of Bavaria (Dayanara Torres), she was invited as a speaker for the International Year of the Child. However, Ella hates living as a princess and wants an independent life.

Meanwhile, in the slums of Manila, Alex (Aga Muhlach), a hardworking jeepney driver, adopted half-brother Paolo (Paolo Contis) who is now an orphan after his mother died. Ella wanted to go around Manila, but was barred by security men. She sought the help of her Aunt Belle (Megan Herrera). The following day, Ella disguised herself as Ms. Thompson, however several barriers came, until she finally left out of the hotel. There she and Alex met and let her live in his house. Alex is a bad-tempered person and he would often scold Ella for some of her mistakes but he secretly falling in love with Ella. It found out that Alex had a lonely childhood. According to Sare (Ruby Rodriguez), Alex's mother ran away and abandoned him and his father. This caused Alex to become mad especially to his half-brother Paolo because of what his mother did. But, he learned to forgive and change.

When King Carlos arrived because of Ella's disappearance, Alex's journalist friend Brix (Smokey Manaloto) learned about Ella's true identity and Ella left Alex and returned home. Ella was told by her father to forget Alex, causing her to tears. Alex, Sare and Paolo try to go to Ella, who is now attended and presided the "International Year of the Child" summit. Paolo came to the scene and Ella decided to give up being a princess for Alex and they were reunited.

Cast

Aga Muhlach as Alex
Dayanara Torres as Princess Marinella of Bavaria/Ella
Paolo Contis as Paolo
Smokey Manaloto as Brix
Ruby Rodriguez as Sare
Heather Rasch as Ms. Thompson
Megan Herrera as Aunt Belle
Bill Campbell as Chief of Security
James Slowey as King of Bavaria
Tony Carreon as Minister of Foreign Affairs
Pocholo Montes as Mr. Garcia
Gammy Viray as Police Officer
Vangie Labalan as Carinderia Owner
Josie Tagle as Minda
Joe Hardy as Neighbor
Babalu as Sgt. Baba (Uncredited)
Jake Vargas as Boy at the Convention 2

Production
Under Star Cinema's film banner, Basta't Kasama Ka is director Rory B. Quintos's feature film directorial debut and fellow romantic comedy film director and colleague Cathy Garcia-Molina served as the assistant director. The screenplay was written by Jerry Lopez Sineneng, Mel Mendoza-Del Rosario, Don Cuaresma and Olivia M. Lamasan, from a story developed by Sineneng and Lamasan.

References

External links

1995 films
Philippine romantic comedy films
1990s Tagalog-language films
Star Cinema films
Films about race and ethnicity
Films directed by Rory Quintos